Justice Rector may refer to:

Henry Massey Rector, associate justice of the Kansas Supreme Court
James Ward Rector, associate justice of the Wisconsin Supreme Court